The Lake Mills Community School District is a rural public school district headquartered in Lake Mills, Iowa.

The district occupies sections of Winnebago and Worth counties, and in addition to Lake Mills, it includes Joice, Scarville, and the surrounding rural areas.

In 2015, Chad Kohagen became the superintendent of the Lake Mills district.

Schools
The district operates three schools, all in Lake Mills:
 Lake Mills Elementary School
 Lake Mills Middle School
 Lake Mills Senior High School

Lake Mills Senior High School

Athletics
The Bulldogs participate in the Top of Iowa Conference in the following sports:
Football
Cross Country
Volleyball
Basketball
Wrestling
 2000 Class 1A State Champions
Golf
Track and Field
Baseball
Softball

See also
List of school districts in Iowa
List of high schools in Iowa

References

External links
 Lake Mills Community School District

School districts in Iowa
Education in Winnebago County, Iowa
Education in Worth County, Iowa